Maldita ciudad (Damn City) is a 1954 Mexican film. It stars Carlos Orellana.

Story 
A book writer from a village offers his book to a film producer, who is looking for a places to set film's scenes. Book writer moves to a big city where he faces problems which make him to regret these events.

Cast
 Fernando Soler - Dr. Antonio Arenas
 Anita Blanch - Doña María
 Carlos Orellana - Lucas
 Sara Guasch - Margot
 Carolina Barret - Josefina
 Felipe Montoya - Sacerdote
 Amparo Arozamena - Amalia
 Rosario Gálvez
 Javier de la Parra - Ramírez
 Ernesto Finance - Dr. Robles
 Héctor Mateos - Padre de Chicho
 Eduardo Alcaraz - Director cinematográfico
 Jorge Landeta - Los chamacones
 Jaime Jiménez Pons - Los chamacones (as Jaime J. Pons)
 Carlos Jiménez - Los chamacones

References

External links
 

1954 films
1950s Spanish-language films
Films directed by Ismael Rodríguez
Mexican black-and-white films
Mexican drama films
1954 drama films
1950s Mexican films